Lydian script was used to write the Lydian language. Like other scripts of Anatolia in the Iron Age, the Lydian alphabet is based on the Phoenician alphabet. It is related to the East Greek alphabet, but it has unique features.

The first modern codification of the Lydian alphabet was made by Roberto Gusmani in 1964, in a combined lexicon, grammar, and text collection.

Early Lydian texts were written either from left to right or from right to left. Later texts all run from right to left. One surviving text is in the bi-directional boustrophedon manner. Spaces separate words except in one text that uses dots instead. Lydian uniquely features a quotation mark in the shape of a right triangle.

Alphabet
The Lydian alphabet is closely related to the other alphabets of Asia Minor as well as to the Greek alphabet. It contains letters for 26 sounds. Some are represented by more than one symbol, which is considered one "letter." Unlike the Carian alphabet, which had an f derived from Φ, the Lydian f has the peculiar 8 shape also found in the Neo-Etruscan alphabet and in Italic alphabets of Osco-Umbrian languages such as Oscan, Umbrian, Old Sabine and South Picene (Old Volscian), and it is thought to be an invention of speakers of a Sabellian language (Osco-Umbrian languages).

In addition, two digraphs, aa and ii, appear to be allophones of [a] and [i] under speculative circumstances, such as lengthening from stress. Complex consonant clusters often appear in the inscriptions and, if present, an epenthetic schwa was evidently not written: 𐤥𐤹𐤯𐤣𐤦𐤣 wctdid [wt͡stθiθ], 𐤨𐤮𐤡𐤷𐤯𐤬𐤨 kśbλtok- [kspʎ̩tok].

Note: a newer transliteration employing p for b, s for ś, š for s, and/or w for v appears in recent publications and the online Dictionary of the Minor Languages of Ancient Anatolia (eDiAna), as well as Melchert's Lydian corpus.

Examples of words
 ora [ora] "month"

 laqrisa [lakʷrisa] "wall, dromos" or "inscription"

 bira [pira] "house, home"

 wcbaqẽnt [w̩t͡spaˈkʷãnd] "to trample on" (from PIE *pekʷ- "to crush")

Unicode

The Lydian alphabet was added to the Unicode Standard in April, 2008 with the release of version 5.1.  It is encoded in Plane 1 (Supplementary Multilingual Plane).

The Unicode block for Lydian is U+10920–U+1093F:

See also
 Lydian language
 Lydia
 Lydians
 Runes

Notes

External links

References

 . Translator Chris Markham.
 French language text.
Gusmani, R. Lydisches Wörterbuch. Mit grammatischer Skizze und Inschriftensammlung, Heidelberg 1964 (Ergänzungsband 1-3, Heidelberg 1980-1986).
Melchert, H. Craig (2004) "Lydian", in Roger D. Woodard (ed.), The Cambridge Encyclopedia of the World's Ancient Languages. Cambridge: Cambridge University Press. . pp. 601–608.
 Shevoroshkin, V. The Lydian Language, Moscow, 1977.

Script
Writing systems
Obsolete writing systems
Right-to-left writing systems